is a Japanese manga series by Suu Minazuki, serialized in Monthly Shōnen Gangan. It ran from 2002 to 2007, with 26 chapters. The sequel, Watashi no Kyūseishu-sama ~lacrima~, was serialized in Monthly GFantasy, with 35 chapters. The whole series has 13 volumes.

External links
 
 

2002 manga
2007 manga
Gangan Comics manga
Shōnen manga
Square Enix franchises